Pritish Chakraborty, also known as Acharya Chakraborty Pritish or ACP, is an Indian actor, director, producer, writer, singer, composer and songwriter. His Bollywood debut was as director–writer-lyricist with the Hindi film, Chal Pichchur Banate Hain (2012); his second, and first as actor-producer, is Mangal Ho, India's first Sci-Fun film set on Mars.

Film and television career
In 2011, Pritish started shooting for his debut Hindi feature film Chal Pichchur Banate Hain as director-writer.

He founded his film production company in 2013 and started working on his next film script Mangal Ho. in which veteran comedians Annu Kapoor and Sanjay Mishra were amongst the first actors to be signed.

The first look Digital Motion Poster of "Mangal Ho" was released on the Indian Republic day, 26 January 2017 while the first look Teaser was released on 15 August 2017 on the Independence Day.

Filmography

References

External links
 
 

Living people
Hindi film producers
Hindi-language film directors
Film directors from Mumbai
Male actors from West Bengal
Indian male film actors
Male actors in Hindi cinema
21st-century Indian actors
1984 births
Film directors from Kolkata